One Lujiazui, previously known as Development Tower, is a skyscraper in Shanghai, China.  It is the 9th tallest building in Shanghai.  Finished in 2008, the tower stands 269 metres tall.  The glass highrise's primary use is as an office building, though it also offers over 6,000 square metres of residential space.   One Lujiazui is located near the Lujiazui Central Park, by the Huangpu River.

Designer 
Design Architect : Tomohiko Yamanashi / NIKKEN SEKKEI (Japan)

See also
 List of tallest buildings in Shanghai

References

External links

Emporis page on Emporis

Office buildings completed in 2008
Skyscrapers in Shanghai
Skyscraper office buildings in China
Residential skyscrapers in China